Ivan Dodig and Filip Polášek defeated the defending champions Rajeev Ram and Joe Salisbury in the final, 6–3, 6–4 to win the men's doubles tennis title at the 2021 Australian Open. With the win, Dodig and Polášek claimed their first Grand Slam title as a team. The victory earned Polášek his first major title, and made him the second Slovak to win one after Daniela Hantuchová.

Mate Pavić was in contention to reclaim the ATP No. 1 doubles ranking, but he failed to do so after he and Nikola Mektić lost in the semifinals to Dodig and Polášek.

Seeds

Draw

Finals

Top half

Section 1

Section 2

Bottom half

Section 3

Section 4

Other entry information

Wild cards

Protected ranking

Alternate pairs

Withdrawals

See also 
2021 Australian Open – Day-by-day summaries

References

External links
Draw
 2021 Australian Open – Men's draws and results at the International Tennis Federation

Men's Doubles
Australian Open (tennis) by year – Men's doubles